GU Piscium is a star in the constellation Pisces. An RS Canum Venaticorum variable, it ranges from magnitude 12.96 to 13.24 over 1.04 days. It is 48 Parsecs (155 light-years) distant from Earth. This star is also believed to be a member of the AB Doradus moving group with a membership probability of 96.9%.

In 2014, it was found to have a gas giant planet—GU Piscium b—orbiting it.

References

Pisces (constellation)
M-type main-sequence stars
RS Canum Venaticorum variables
Piscium, GU